Nuriootpa may refer to.

Nuriootpa, South Australia, a town and locality
Hundred of Nuriootpa, a cadastral unit in South Australia
District Council of Nuriootpa, a former local government area in South Australia  - see Hundred of Nuriootpa